William Maxfield was a British Whig politician.

At the 1832 general election he was elected as a Member of Parliament (MP) for Grimsby, defeating the Tory MP Lord Loughborough. He stood down at the 1835 general election.

References

External links 
 

Year of birth missing
Year of death missing
Whig (British political party) MPs for English constituencies
UK MPs 1832–1835
Members of the Parliament of the United Kingdom for Great Grimsby